Władysław Mieczysław Kozłowski (November 17, 1858 in Kiev – April 25, 1935 in Konstancin-Jeziorna) was a Polish philosopher.

Life
Kozłowski lectured at Brussels' Université Nouvelle and at Geneva University.  In 1919–28 he was professor of the theory and methodology of science at Poznań University.
  
His philosophical views were a synthesis of Positivism and Neo-Kantism.

Works
Przyrodoznawstwo i filozofia (Natural Science and Philosophy ;1909)
Podstawy logiki (The Foundations of Logic; 1916).

See also
History of philosophy in Poland
List of Poles

Notes

References
"Kozłowski, Władysław Mieczysław," Encyklopedia Powszechna PWN (PWN Universal Encyclopedia), Warsaw, Państwowe Wydawnictwo Naukowe, vol. 2, 1974, pp. 586–87.

1858 births
1935 deaths
20th-century Polish philosophers

Polish positivists
19th-century Polish philosophers